HealthCap is a specialized provider of venture capital within life sciences. HealthCap invests in innovative companies with focus on therapeutics. As of 2017, HealthCap has invested in over 100 companies since inception and completed initial public offerings of more than 40 companies. HealthCap has offices in Stockholm, Oslo and Lausanne.

History
The firm was founded in 1996 by Björn Odlander  and Peder Fredrikson, and the first fund was started the same year. As of 2017, HealthCap has established seven funds and financed 106 companies, where 39 have been taken public on nine different markets. The most recent fund, HealthCap VII, was established in the fall of 2015.
In 2017, HealthCap had approximately 23 employees out of which ten are partners. The team combines venture capital investing experience with competencies and work experiences from small as well as large companies across the healthcare industry, spanning disciplines of scientific research, drug development, clinical practice, investment banking, and industry management.

Investments
HealthCap has raised seven main funds. HealthCap IV-VII are Delaware Limited Partnerships with Swiss general partners. Investors in HealthCap funds include, among others, European Investment Fund, Skandia Life Insurance, the 4th and 6th Swedish National Pension Funds, The Kresge Foundation, Mayo Clinic, Northwestern University, University of Michigan, Vanderbilt University and Washington University. HealthCap has committed capital exceeding EUR 1 billion.

HealthCap invests in companies developing disruptive technologies that hold the potential to change clinical practice. Over the years HealthCap has invested in more than 100 companies. The portfolio companies have developed more than 20 pharmaceutical products and over 40 med-tech products to the market. Many of these products, such as Firazyr®, Xofigo®, Tracleer®, are breakthrough therapies addressing life-threatening diseases. Examples of technologies financed by HealthCap are: 
  Pulmonary arterial hypertension therapy developed by Actelion. The company was acquired by J&J in 2017.
  Xofigo® developed by Algeta for treatment of bone metastasis in prostate cancer. 
  A range of drugs in development for rare and ultra-rare genetic diseases by Ultragenyx. 
  Restylane, an injectable filler developed by Q-Med. The company was acquired by Galderma in 2011.
  Trans-femoral Aortic valve replacement developed by CoreValve  that evades the need for open heart surgery when replacing a malfunctioning heart valve.
  High-throughput protein screening technologies developed by Five Prime Therapeutics.
  Injectable synthetic bone substitute, Cerament, to enhance bone remodeling and fracture healing developed by BoneSupport AB.
  WTX101, an orphan drug currently in development by Wilson Therapeutics for the treatment of Wilson's disease.

References

External links
 HealthCap website

Venture capital firms of Sweden
Private equity and venture capital investors
Private equity firms of Sweden
Life sciences industry